Vrindavan railway station is on the Mathura–Vrindavan link.  It is located in Mathura district in the Indian state of Uttar Pradesh. It serves Vrindavan.

Overview
Krishna was born in Mathura. He spent his childhood in Vrindavan.  Therefore, both are major pilgrimage centres for Hindus.

History
The -long -wide metre-gauge Mathura–Vrindaban branch line was opened by Bombay, Baroda and Central India Railway in 1889.

Trains
Mathura is a major railway junction. The Taj Express travelling from Hazrat Nizamuddin railway station covers the distance up to Mathura in about 2 hours. Bhopal Shatabdi Express (starting from New Delhi railway station), travelling faster, also stops at Mathura. There are five DEMU connections a day between Mathura and Vrindaban.

References

External links

Vrindavan Railway Station Information

Railway stations in Mathura district
Agra railway division
Vrindavan